The 1989 English Professional Championship was a professional non-ranking snooker tournament, which took place in February 1989 in Bristol, England. This was the final edition of the tournament.

Mike Hallett won the title by defeating John Parrott 9–7 in the final.

Main draw

References

English Professional Championship
English Professional Championship
English Professional Championship
English Professional Championship